The 1974 Seton Hall Pirates baseball team represented Seton Hall University in the 1974 NCAA Division I baseball season. The Pirates played their home games at Owen T. Carroll Field. The team was coached by Mike Sheppard in his 2nd year as head coach at Seton Hall.

The Pirates won the District II Playoff to advance to the College World Series, where they were defeated by the Texas Longhorns.

Roster

Schedule

! style="" | Regular Season
|- valign="top" 

|- align="center" bgcolor="#ffcccc"
| 1 || March 18 || at Miami  (FL) || Mark Light Field • Coral Gables, Florida || 3–4 || 0–1 || –
|- align="center" bgcolor="#ccffcc"
| 2 || March 20 || vs  || Mark Light Field • Coral Gables, Florida || 10–6 || 1–1 || –
|- align="center" bgcolor="#ffcccc"
| 3 || March 20 || at Miami (FL) || Mark Light Field • Coral Gables, Florida || 2–6 || 1–2 || –
|- align="center" bgcolor="#ffcccc"
| 4 || March 21 || vs  || Mark Light Field • Coral Gables, Florida || 4–8 || 1–3 || –
|- align="center" bgcolor="#ffcccc"
| 5 || March 22 || vs Michigan State || Mark Light Field • Coral Gables, Florida || 6–20 || 1–4 || –
|- align="center" bgcolor="#ccffcc"
| 6 || March 22 || vs  || Mark Light Field • Coral Gables, Florida || 9–4 || 2–4 || –
|- align="center" bgcolor="#ccffcc"
| 7 || March 23 || vs Ohio State || Mark Light Field • Coral Gables, Florida || 7–6 || 3–4 || –
|- align="center" bgcolor="#ccffcc"
| 8 || March  || vs  || Unknown • Unknown || 10–2 || 4–4 || –
|- align="center" bgcolor="#ccffcc"
| 9 || March 28 || at  || Bainton Field • Piscataway, New Jersey || 12–6 || 5–4 || –
|-

|- align="center" bgcolor="#ccffcc"
| 10 || April 1 ||  || Owen T. Carroll Field • South Orange, New Jersey || 11–0 || 6–4 || –
|- align="center" bgcolor="#ffcccc"
| 11 || April  || Buffalo || Unknown • Unknown || 0–5 || 6–5 || –
|- align="center" bgcolor="#ccffcc"
| 12 || April  || Buffalo || Unknown • Unknown || 2–1 || 7–5 || –
|- align="center" bgcolor="#ccffcc"
| 13 || April  ||  || Unknown • Unknown || 5–2 || 8–5 || 1–0
|- align="center" bgcolor="#ccffcc"
| 14 || April  ||  || Unknown • Unknown || 6–1 || 9–5 || 1–0
|- align="center" bgcolor="#ccffcc"
| 15 || April  ||  || Unknown • Unknown || 11–10 || 10–5 || 2–0
|- align="center" bgcolor="#ccffcc"
| 16 || April  ||  || Unknown • Unknown || 5–4 || 11–5 || 2–0
|- align="center" bgcolor="#ccffcc"
| 17 || April  ||  || Unknown • Unknown || 3–2 || 12–5 || 3–0
|- align="center" bgcolor="#ccffcc"
| 18 || April  ||  || Unknown • Unknown || 13–3 || 13–5 || 4–0
|- align="center" bgcolor="#ccffcc"
| 19 || April 18 || Rutgers || Owen T. Carroll Field • South Orange, New Jersey || 1–0 || 14–5 || 4–0
|- align="center" bgcolor="#ccffcc"
| 20 || April  ||  || Unknown • Unknown || 11–1 || 15–5 || 5–0
|- align="center" bgcolor="#ccffcc"
| 21 || April  ||  || Unknown • Unknown || 3–2 || 16–5 || 6–0
|- align="center" bgcolor="#ccffcc"
| 22 || April  ||  || Unknown • Unknown || 11–1 || 17–5 || 7–0
|- align="center" bgcolor="#ffcccc"
| 23 || April 25 ||  || Owen T. Carroll Field • South Orange, New Jersey || 0–4 || 17–6 || 7–0
|- align="center" bgcolor="#ccffcc"
| 24 || April 26 || Wagner|| Unknown • Unknown || 17–0 || 18–6 || 8–0
|- align="center" bgcolor="#ccffcc"
| 25 || April 27 || Fairleigh Dickinson || Unknown • Unknown || 9–7 || 19–6 || 9–0
|- align="center" bgcolor="#ccffcc"
| 26 || April 28 ||  || Unknown • Unknown  || 8–3 || 20–6 || 9–0
|- align="center" bgcolor="#ccffcc"
| 27 || April  ||  || Unknown • Unknown || 7–0 || 21–6 || 9–0
|-

|- align="center" bgcolor="#ccffcc"
| 28 || May  || LIU Brooklyn || Unknown • Unknown || 7–4 || 22–6 || 10–0
|- align="center" bgcolor="#ccffcc"
| 29 || May  ||  || Unknown • Unknown || 12–2 || 23–6 || 10–0
|- align="center" bgcolor="#ffcccc"
| 30 || May  ||  || Unknown • Unknown || 8–9 || 23–7 || 10–1
|- align="center" bgcolor="#ccffcc"
| 31 || May 5 || at  || McGeehan Field • Villanova, Pennsylvania || 8–9 || 24–7 || 10–1
|- align="center" bgcolor="#ccffcc"
| 32 || May  || Iona || Unknown • Unknown || 14–9 || 25–7 || 11–1
|- align="center" bgcolor="#ccffcc"
| 33 || May  || CCNY || Unknown • Unknown || 26–4 || 26–7 || 12–1
|- align="center" bgcolor="#ffcccc"
| 34 || May  || C. W. Post || Unknown • Unknown || 5–7 || 26–8 || 12–2
|- align="center" bgcolor="#ccffcc"
| 35 || May  || St. Francis (NY) || Unknown • Unknown || 4–3 || 27–8 || 13–2
|- align="center" bgcolor="#ccffcc"
| 36 || May  ||  || Unknown • Unknown || 7–2 || 28–8 || 13–2
|- align="center" bgcolor="#ccffcc"
| 37 || May  || Manhattan || Unknown • Unknown || 6–0 || 29–8 || 14–2
|- align="center" bgcolor="#ccffcc"
| 38 || May  ||  || Unknown • Unknown || 8–2 || 30–8 || 14–2
|- align="center" bgcolor="#fffdd0"
| 39 || May  ||  || Unknown • Unknown || 0–0 || 30–8–1 || 14–2
|-

|-
! style="" | Postseason
|- valign="top" 

|- align="center" bgcolor="#ccffcc"
| 40 || May 24 || vs  || Unknown • West Windsor, New Jersey || 4–1 || 31–8–1 || 14–2
|- align="center" bgcolor="#ccffcc"
| 41 || May 25 || vs  || Unknown • West Windsor, New Jersey || 4–3 || 32–8–1 || 14–2
|- align="center" bgcolor="#ccffcc"
| 42 || May  || St. John's || Unknown • West Windsor, New Jersey || 11–8 || 33–8–1 || 14–2
|-

|- align="center" bgcolor="#ffcccc"
| 43 || June 8 || vs  || Omaha Municipal Stadium • Omaha, Nebraska || 1–5 || 33–9–1 || 14–2
|- align="center" bgcolor="#ffcccc"
| 44 || June 10 || vs Texas || Omaha Municipal Stadium • Omaha, Nebraska || 2–12 || 33–10–1 || 14–2
|-

References

Seton Hall Pirates baseball seasons
Seton Hall Pirates baseball
College World Series seasons
Seton Hall